Paddy Kayiwa Mukasa aka Paddyman is a  Ugandan music producer,  who has produced songs for almost every top musician in Uganda. He has worked on many songs that have turned out to be classics

Produced works 
He is the producer behind the timeless hits such as Valu Valu by DR Jose Chameleone, Banyabo by Rema Namakula, Birowoozo by Iryn Namubiru, Wanimba by Eddy Kenzo, Survivor by Judith Babirye, Pressure Ya Love by Chosen blood and Walden, Bamuyita YESU by Pr wilson bugembe, agenze by Bebecool, trouble by Bebecool,   maama mbile by Bobiwine and juliana, Bada by Bobiwine ,  kiwani by Bobiwine , Bibuuzo , time bomb ,  ayagala mulasi by Bobiwine.  abakyala bazira, sooka osabe by Jamal.

Bilowooza , Nabulo , Kabi Kii , Tebiba bingi ,  kawoowo  by Iryn Namubiru ,

Judith Babirye's Olugendo , yeggwe Kabaka ,  and many others

Pain killer by Aziz Azion

Omukwano gunyuma by samali matovu

Dilema by cindy mr.g and bobiwine

Valu Valu, Badilisha, Basima Ongeze by chameleon

and all these and so many more other  songs have went on to win awards

Awards
Music producer Paddyman is an awarded producer

He won the "Producer of the Year" award at the 2011 PAM awards.

VIGA award Best  producer of the year 2014

STUDIO/COMPANY 
Music producer paddyman is the founder owner and senior music producer at audio1 records

Audio1 Records  is a studio With cutting-edge recording equipment that specializes in the production of music but also offers a variety of other services

PADDDYMAN'S MUSIC 
paddyman is not only a producer, he is an artist too and some of his songs include

 Vva mukkubo lyange
 christmas featuring Bobi wine
 ebilooto
 milelembe
 nsabira ungada
 nze naguzza
 ekimala kimala
 be humble

References

1985 births
Living people
Ugandan record producers